Bhuwana Malla, also known as Subarna Malla, was a Malla Dynasty king and the second King of Bhadgaon after the division of Kathmandu Valley. He reigned from 1505 until his death in 1519.

Life 
Bhuwana Malla was the son of Raya Malla, and the grandson of Yakshya Malla. After the division of Kathmandu Valley upon the death of Yakshya Malla, Banepa was being ruled separately by Rana Malla, the third son of Yakshya Malla. Raya Malla died in 1505 and Bhuwana Malla was still in his early age. Rana Malla came to Bhadgaon to assist his nephew in ruling the kingdom. Rana Malla died while his son was a child and Bhuwana Malla annexed Banepa into Bhadgaon.

During his reign in 1513, a severe famine overtook Bhadgaun forcing many of its inhabitants to migrate to other regions.

Succession 
Bhuwana Malla died somewhere around 1519 and was succeeded by the joint rule of his sons until around 1534. Prana Malla then ruled Bhadgaon on his own.

References

Citations

Bibliography 

 
 
 

Nepalese monarchs
Malla rulers of Bhaktapur
16th-century Nepalese people
1519 deaths